Ekaterina Kirillova (born 21 February 1973) is a Belarusian female curler and curling coach. She is right-handed.

Achievements
Belarusian Mixed Doubles Curling Championship: gold (2016).

Teams and events

Women's

Mixed

Mixed doubles

Coaching (national teams)

References

External links

1973 births
Living people
Belarusian female curlers
Belarusian curling champions
Belarusian curling coaches